Solomon Carpet is an Iranian acrylic and BCF yarn spinning and machine-made carpet producer located in Isfahan. This company is one of the leading manufacturers/exporters of machine-made carpets in middle east. The company registered as "Rasoul Isfahan Industrial company" to produce variety of yarns and machine-made carpets in different sizes and patterns.

The company was founded on 1982 by Hassan Kardan, Hossein Asadi, Reza Monzavizadeh, Ali Kardanpour and other partners in historical city of Isfahan. Current owners of company are Reza Monzavizadeh and Ali Kardanpour. Many countries such as Canada, UK, Swede, Russia, UAE, South Korea, Singapore, etc. use its exquisite silk carpets. In 2019, Reza Rahmani, Minister of Industry, Mine and Trade of Iran acknowledged this company as the prominent industrial unit of Isfahan province. Solomon Carpet has over 1,150 workers.

Products 
In 2019, the world's largest machine-made carpet with an area of 700 square meters and a density of 3600 was produced by the company to order in Oman. The carpet, which took 50 days to design and 30 days to weave and complete, was woven with 1 billion and 10 million knots. This carpet weighs two thousand kilograms and is used in the Sultan Qaboos Grand Mosque, largest mosque of Salalah, Oman.Bank Melli Iran, one of the oldest and main banks of Iran, was financial sponsors of this company.

This company produces various textile products, including:

 Various types of acrylic yarn
 Production of Polyester and Polypropylene yarns
 Production of machine-made carpets with acrylic staple, acrylic TOW, polyester and polypropylene yarn in different grades
 Production of Silk carpets with density from 960 to 4500.

References

External links 

 
 
 

Manufacturing companies established in 1982
Iranian brands
Carpet manufacturing companies
1982 establishments in Iran